Pablo Diogo Lopes de Lima (born 18 December 1992), simply known as Pablo Diogo or Pablo, is a Brazilian footballer who plays as a winger for Chapecoense. He also plays as a right back.

Club career
Born in Campinas, São Paulo, Pablo was a Guarani youth graduate. He made his first team – and Série A – debut on 20 November 2010, coming on as a second-half substitute for Preto in a 1–2 away loss against Flamengo. He appeared in two further matches during the campaign, as his side suffered relegation.

On 14 December 2012, Pablo was loaned to Monte Azul for six months. Shortly after his loan expired, he moved to Oeste.

Pablo scored his first professional goal on 13 September 2013, netting his team's second in a 2–1 Série B win at Paraná. He was regularly used by his new side, appearing in 28 matches and scoring two goals.

On 2 June 2015 Pablo signed for Atlético Mineiro, being immediately loaned to América Mineiro for the remainder of the season.

In 2016, Pablo was loaned to J1 League club Vegalta Sendai. In 2017, he returned to Atlético and was integrated into the main squad.

On 28 January 2020 he scored an own goal against Santos in the 93rd minute, which cost them the match.

References

External links

Living people
1992 births
Sportspeople from Campinas
Brazilian footballers
Association football forwards
Campeonato Brasileiro Série A players
Campeonato Brasileiro Série B players
Guarani FC players
Atlético Monte Azul players
Oeste Futebol Clube players
Clube Atlético Mineiro players
América Futebol Clube (MG) players
Clube de Regatas Brasil players
J1 League players
Vegalta Sendai players
Primeira Liga players
C.D. Santa Clara players
Coritiba Foot Ball Club players
Associação Chapecoense de Futebol players
Brazilian expatriate footballers
Brazilian expatriates in Japan
Brazilian expatriates in Portugal
Expatriate footballers in Japan
Expatriate footballers in Portugal